Susan Linda Bay Nimoy (born March 16, 1943) is an American actress and director. Among her television appearances, she portrayed Admiral Rollman in two episodes of the television series Star Trek: Deep Space Nine: "Past Prologue" in the first season and "Whispers" in the second.

Bay was one of the Original Six, a group of women directors who created the Women's Steering Committee of the Directors Guild of America, to protest against gender discrimination in Hollywood. Bay has directed several documentaries, and the American premiere of Shakespeare's Will (2007). She returned to directing in 2018 with Eve, a film addressing issues of aging and mourning. She wrote the script while grieving for her husband, Leonard Nimoy.

Career

Acting 
Bay first appeared in The Many Loves of Dobie Gillis (TV series, 1963) and The Skydivers  (film, 1963). She appeared in various TV series throughout the 1960s, including episodes of Dr. Kildare (1964) and Perry Mason (1965). Susan Bay's film debut in a leading role occurred in the Jerry Lewis comedy The Big Mouth (1967). Bay portrayed Suzie Cartwright, the love interest of Lewis's character, Gerald Clamson.

During the 1970s and 1980s, Bay's television roles included episodes of One Day at a Time (1976), Starsky and Hutch (1977), Hart to Hart (1980), Family Ties (1983) and  Remington Steele (1983). She also had a lead role in the television movie Alone at Last (1980). She played Admiral Rollman in  Star Trek: Deep Space Nines first and second season in the episodes "Past Prologue" (1993) and "Whispers" (1994).

Bay appeared as Rebecca in the 2009 film Mother and Child.

In 2019, she began to appear in the CDC's Anti-Smoking Campaign "Tips from Former Smokers" discussing her late husband's battle with COPD.

Directing 
In 1979, Bay and other members of the Original Six, a group of women directors, created the Women's Steering Committee of the Directors Guild of America, to protest against gender discrimination in Hollywood and support female employment on film and television sets at the directing level.

Bay was a production consultant on "The Good Mother" (1988), which was directed by Leonard Nimoy.

In 1998, Susan Bay was the executive producer for the documentary film Liza Lou, on the glass bead artist Liza Lou. She has also worked on documentaries about Twyla Tharp and the magazine Mother Jones.

In 2007, Bay directed the American premiere of Shakespeare's Will, a solo play by Vern Thiessen that featured Jeanmarie Simpson as Anne Hathaway.

Susan Bay Nimoy returned to directing in 2018 with Eve, writing the script as she mourned her husband, Leonard Nimoy, and starring in the film after the lead actress pulled out at the last minute due to discomfort with revealing her aging body on film. The lack of representation of "women of age" onscreen was one of Nimoy's motivations in creating the film. Eve was one of five films at the 2018 Sundance Film Festival to focus on women in their 70s, and was positively received.

Philanthropy
Bay is a member of the board of directors of the Foundation for National Progress, which publishes the magazine Mother Jones.

In 1999, Bay and Nimoy made a $100,000 donation to the Museum of Contemporary Art, Los Angeles (MOCA) so it could purchase The Ballad of Sexual Dependency by Nan Goldin.
In 2007, they financially supported WACK! Art and the Feminist Revolution, an art exhibition at the MOCA.
In 2008, they made a $1 million donation to The Leonard Nimoy Event Horizon Theater at Griffith Observatory.

Personal life 
Bay is a cousin of Rabbi John Rosove, of Temple Israel of Hollywood, as well as film director Michael Bay.

In 1978, Bay married actor John Schuck, and their son Aaron was born in 1981. They divorced in 1983.

She married Leonard Nimoy on New Year's Day 1989. She was photographed for Nimoy's Shekhina, a book of monochrome nude photography of women representing Shekhinah, the presence of God in Judaism. She and Nimoy were together until his death in February 2015 in California.

References

External links
 

Living people
20th-century American actresses
21st-century American actresses
American film actresses
American television actresses
Jewish American actresses
American female models
American artists' models
Jewish female models
Jewish American philanthropists
1943 births
Place of birth missing (living people)
21st-century American Jews